Santo Amaro do Maranhão is a municipality in the state of Maranhão in the Northeast region of Brazil.

The municipality contains part of the  Upaon-Açu/Miritiba/Alto Preguiças Environmental Protection Area, created in 1992.

The city os Santo Amaro do Maranhão is one of the 3 that are part of Lençóis Maranhenses National Park, an uncommon landscape which mixes dunes and cristal clear lakes.

See also
List of municipalities in Maranhão

References

Municipalities in Maranhão
Populated coastal places in Maranhão